St Decuman's is  a Grade I listed building in Rhoscrowther, Pembrokeshire, Wales.

History
The  parish church is on a very early Christian site and is dedicated to Saint Decuman. It was the "bishop-house" of the cantref of Penfro and one of the seven principal churches in Dyfed under medieval Welsh law. The church is in the care of Friends of Friendless Churches.

Description
Samuel Lewis in 1833 considered the church "not distinguished by any remarkable architectural details". It was restored from 1852 and the roof was renewed in 1870. There was further restoration in 1910. It was Grade I listed in 1970.

Structure
It is constructed of rubble stone under a slate roof which carries a bellcote. The nave and chancel are possibly 13th century and the transept, chapel and tower 14th century.

Internal features
The font, in the north porch, is 12th or 13th century; the nave has a small Norman font. The church contains a number of tombs and memorials, including two recesses and wall-mounted coffin lids. The oldest dated memorial is a 1716 baroque monument to F Powell of Greenhill. The pulpit and lectern are 19th century, and windows range from the 19th and 20th centuries, as recently as 1960.

References

Rhoscrowther